Abbas Jirari ( born 15 February 1937 in Rabat), also known as Abbas al-Jarari, Abbas al-Jirari or Abbès Jirari, is a Moroccan intellectual and advisor to King Mohammed VI of Morocco.

Biography
Jirari studied Arabic language and literature at the University of Cairo in Egypt and worked in the Moroccan ministry of foreign affairs in the 1960s. He is currently a professor at the Faculty of Arts and Humanities in Rabat.

He was one of the 138 signatories of the open letter for Christian-Muslim dialogue A Common Word Between Us and You.

He is married and the father of three children.

References

External links
 abbesjirari.com (Official website)
 diwanalarab.com: عبـاس الجراري
 uemnet.free.fr: عباس الجراري
 andalusite.ma: عباس الجراري

1937 births
Living people
Academic staff of Mohammed V University
Advisors of Mohammed VI of Morocco
Member of the Academy of the Kingdom of Morocco
Cairo University alumni